Dominic Inglot and Henri Kontinen were the defending champions, but Kontinen chose not to participate this year. Inglot played alongside Daniel Nestor, but lost in the quarterfinals to Roman Jebavý and Matwé Middelkoop.

Jebavý and Middelkoop went on to win the title, defeating Julio Peralta and Horacio Zeballos in the final, 6–4, 6–4.

Seeds

Draw

Draw

References
 Main Draw

St. Petersburg Open - Doubles
St. Petersburg Open